The 1997–1998 French Rugby Union Championship was played by 20 teams divided in the preliminary phase in two pools of 12. The first four team of each pool were admitted to quarters of final.

Stade Français won the title beating in the final the Montferrand (that lose for 5th time the final). 
It was the first victory for Stade Français after 90 years, the last was in 1908.

For the first time, the final was played in the new Stade de France

Montpellier was relegated in second division. Five teams were promoted from the second division in order to increase the 1998–99 championship to 24 teams.

Preliminary Phase

Quarter-final

Semi-final

Final

French Rugby Chanmpionship
French rugby union championship
Championship